Omphalodes verna, the creeping navelwort or blue-eyed-Mary, is a rhizomatous herbaceous perennial plant in the genus Omphalodes belonging to the family Boraginaceae.

Etymology
The genus name Omphalodes derives from the Greek  word , meaning navel, referring to the shape of the small fruits, while the name verna of the species, deriving from the Latin , refers to the early blooming flowers.

Description
 Omphalodes verna can reach  in height. The stem snakes across the ground (hence the alternative name of creeping forget-me-not).  The overwintering buds are situated just below the soil surface (hemicryptophyte). This species can spread quickly, it is hard to uproot and by some accounts may even be invasive, but mostly coexists with other plants well.

They are veiny, with fine hairs and oval to heart in shape, and pointed at the tip.

In Spring the plant produces clusters of 3-5 petiolated small, light blue hermaphrodite flowers with white or yellow star-shaped centers. These plants bloom from March through May.

Creeping navelwort is cultivated in many countries as an ornamental plant. It may be easily propagated from seeds. It may be confused with forget-me-not (Myosotis sp.), as flowers are very similar, but it can be distinguished by its much larger and coarser, slightly prickly leaves, its firm grip with the ground, and its quite different fruits, which are not covered in fine hooked hairs to assist in transport as forget-me-not fruits are.

Distribution
It is widespread in central and south-eastern Europe, excluding the Pyrenees. It is also present in Quebec, Canada.

Habitat
This species typically grows in the shade of trees, in fresh mountain forests (especially beech), wastelands and scrublands.

Gallery

References

External links

 Pignatti S. - Flora d'Italia – Edagricole – 1982 – Vol. II, pag. 428
 Tutin, T.G. et al. - Flora Europaea, second edition - 1993
 Biolib
 Navelwort

verna